Helene Chadwick (November 25, 1897 – September 4, 1940) was an American actress in silent and in early sound films.

Early life and career
Chadwick was born in the small town of Chadwicks, New York, which was named for her great-grandfather. Her parents were George W. Chadwick Jr. and Marie Louise Norton Chadwick. Her mother was a singer who performed on the stage and her father was a business man.

She began making films for Pathé Pictures in Manhattan, New York. Her first film was The Challenge (1916), which was produced by Astra Film Corporation and released by Pathé. A director was impressed by Chadwicks's talent as an equestrian, thus she began acting as a western star but this did not continue with the exodus of film production from the east to the west coast. Signed by Samuel Goldwyn, Chadwick went to California in 1913 and entered silent movies in 1916. At the pinnacle of her acting career, she earned a salary estimated to have been $2,000 per week. From 1929 until 1935, she found success as a character actress when sound was being introduced to films.

In the final five years of her life, she was reduced to taking roles as an extra, playing "atmospheric parts". Helene made movies with Warner Brothers, Columbia Pictures, 20th Century Fox, Metro-Goldwyn-Mayer, Paramount Pictures, and other studios. Her final film was Mary Burns, Fugitive (1935).

Her most noteworthy performances came in Heartsease (1919), The Long Arm of the Manister (1919), The Cup of Fury (1920), Godless Men (1920),  Dangerous Curve Ahead (1921), From The Ground Up (1921), Yellow Men and Gold (1922), Dust Flower (1922), The Sin Flood (1922), The Glorious Fool (1922), and Quicksands (1923).

Personal life and death
Helene's great-grandparents were the founders of Chadwicks, NY, a small village in Oneida County, NY. Her great-grandfather built a cotton factory on Sauquoit Creek and was one of the premier manufacturers of textiles in the Mohawk Valley. Her family came from England, in Oldham, Lancashire County. She attended school at a one-room schoolhouse provided by her great-grandfather for the mill workers.

In January 1919, Chadwick became engaged to William A. Wellman, an American pilot with the Lafayette Flying Corps. He had just returned from France and was cited for bravery for his valor in World War I. The couple had met at a party at the house of a friend. Wellman was signed to play a prominent role in an upcoming movie with Douglas Fairbanks Sr. The couple wed in July 1921, but in the summer of 1923, Chadwick sued Wellman for divorce on grounds of desertion and nonsupport. At the time of their separation, William was directing movies for Fox Film.

Chadwick's funeral was conducted by Pierce Brothers Mortuary and attended by stage and screen friends. Her body was returned to Chadwicks and she is buried in the Sauquoit Valley Cemetery.

Selected filmography

Sources
The Los Angeles Times, "Flashes, Picture Star To Wed", January 11, 1919, Page II3.
The Los Angeles Times, "She Could Ride", October 15, 1922, Page III30.
The Los Angeles Times, "Film Star Seeks Divorce", July 24, 1923, Page II1.
The Los Angeles Times, "Former Star of Films Dies", September 6, 1940, Page A1.
The Los Angeles Times, "Helene Chadwick Paid Last Honor", September 8, 1940, Page A2.
The Oakland Tribune, "Cinema Close-Ups", June 3, 1923, Page 92.

References

External links

Helene Chadwick at Virtual History

American film actresses
American silent film actresses
Actresses from New York (state)
1897 births
1940 deaths
20th-century American actresses